Events in the year 2000 in Monaco.

Incumbents 
 Monarch: Rainier III
 State Minister: Patrick Leclercq

Events 

 June – Ernst August, Prince of Hanover, husband of Princess Caroline of Monaco, caused an international incident, angering the Turkish government, by urinating on the Turkish Pavilion at the Expo 2000.
 4 June – David Coulthard won the 2000 Monaco Grand Prix.

Deaths

See also 

 2000 in Europe
 City states

References 

 
Years of the 20th century in Monaco
2000s in Monaco
Monaco
Monaco